Roddam is a village and civil parish about 24 miles from Morpeth, in the county of Northumberland, England. In 2001 the parish had a population of 77. The parish touches Bewick, Hedgeley, Ilderton, Ingram and Lilburn. It lies near the foot of the Cheviot Hills.

Landmarks 
There are 16 listed buildings in Roddam, including Roddam Hall.

History 
The name "Roddam" means 'At the clearings'. Roddam is a deserted medieval village, the village existed in 1296 but by the 19th century it had almost disappeared. Roddam was formerly a township in the parish of Ilderton, in 1866 Roddam became a civil parish in its own right. On 1 April 1955 Reaveley, Roseden and Wooperton parishes were merged with Roddam.

References 

 

Villages in Northumberland
Civil parishes in Northumberland